Screensport was a pan-European cable and satellite sports television network that was on air from 1984 until 1993 before merging with Eurosport.

History

1984–1986: Early years
 
Screensport was founded in 1981 by Bob Kennedy — who had started up BBC Radio Leicester, Sky Channel (operators of the UK's first satellite television network which later became known as Sky One) and several independent commercial radio stations, backers included the American networks ABC and ESPN. A programming deal with Trans World International allowed access to events taking place around the world.

The channel began broadcasting on 29 March 1984, with Media Communications controlled the studios and transmission facilities in Knutsford, while its administration office was based in London. Apart from American sports, the station aired regular and weekly British sports including speedways and stock cars. Screensport aired only recorded programming until 31 August of that year, when they showed live greyhound racing from Wembley Stadium – including the St Leger. By late 1984, WHSmith Television Group had purchased a 15% stake in the company, RCA also acquired a 10% share in the business, within other investors included Ladbrokes and the pension fund of the National Coal Board. Former BBC executive Aubrey Singer was a prominent board member.

On 28 August 1985, the station started to expand its broadcasting area to include the Netherlands and Sweden, introducing new programmes and sports including ice speedway, Dutch ice hockey and motor sport. Coverage of English football began in the same year, screening the Area and National finals from the Freight Rover Trophy, a competition for lower division clubs. In addition, the channel both sponsored and broadcast the Football League Super Cup in the 1985–86 season. The competition was designed to compensate clubs who were banned from European competition due to the Heysel Stadium disaster, but it was scrapped after the first edition.

1987–1992: WHSmith era
On 1 December 1986, the WHSmith Television Group took over the operation and management of the network when Bob Kennedy and ABC pulled out. By the end of that year, the station had lost £700,000 and no longer broadcast in Sweden, which resulted in a loss of 100,000 customers.

On 9 April 1987, as the channel had acquired rights to cover some major events, Screensport broadcast live coverage of the US Masters golf from Augusta, and many other PGA Tour events. Grand Slam tennis was also covered in the shape of the US Open. NHL ice hockey, NBA and NASCAR racing were common items on the schedule during this period. During the 1987–88 football season, Screensport was the only source of weekly extended English Football League highlights for viewers in the United Kingdom. The channel signed a deal with Thames Television, who were the Football League's agent for international distribution, to transmit 34 recorded matches via cable and satellite. Thames produced its programme, called the Big League Soccer.

On 7 December 1988, ESPN increased its stake in the channel from 3.5% to 25.5% after purchasing shares from WHSmith for £4.4 million. By then, Screensport had increased its sports content, allowing the channel to broadcast for 18.5 hours each day within the schedule included ice hockey, skiing, golf, tennis, and yachting. By 1989, Screensport adopted the sub-title The European Sports Network, while the WHSmith Television Group later renamed itself as WHSTV. The channel also began broadcasting on the Astra 1A satellite in February of that year, following a move of its operations from the north of England to central London, after taking full control of Molinare later that year on 17 May, which helped to operate as one channel under four different names:
 Screensport (English)
 TV Sport (French)
 Sportkanal (German)
 Sportnet (Dutch)

On 15 May 1991, Screensport filed with the Commission of the European Communities, alleging that the joint purchasing scheme for sporting events by Eurosport's former owners, Sky Television and the European Broadcasting Union, violated the competition (antitrust) law rules of the Treaty of Rome. After provisions were made for non-member access to the programming, the Commission granted the EBU in a five-year conditional exemption from the requirements of the competition rules. On 28 February 1992, Screensport forged an alliance with ITV Sport to bid for rights to coverage of the newly formed English Premier League. Sky Sports and the BBC were the eventual winners of the contract.

1993: Demise
On 14 January 1993, Eurosport and Screensport proposed a merger to provide a single channel as both were operating at a loss, hoping that a merged channel would become financially profitable. The merger finally took place on 1 March and that same day, Screensport was shut down permanently. It ended with a credit screen listing all the network's staff (akin to its sister channel Lifestyle's close on 24 January of that year), before cutting to Eurosport's feed surrounded by a notice telling viewers to watch any of its frequencies.

Finally on 6 March 1993 at 6.09am, Screensport's signal was shut down permanently as RTL Zwei was launched in its transponder place.

See also
 List of European television stations
 Timeline of cable television in the United Kingdom
 Europa TV
 Sport1

References

External links
 Screensport at TV Ark

History of television in the United Kingdom
Defunct television channels in the United Kingdom
Defunct television channels in the Netherlands
Television channels and stations established in 1984
1984 establishments in the United Kingdom
Television channels and stations disestablished in 1993
1993 disestablishments in the United Kingdom
Sports television channels in the United Kingdom
1980s in Europe
1980s in British television
1980s in French television
1980s in German television
1980s in Dutch television
1990s in Europe
1990s in British television
1990s in French television
1990s in German television
1990s in Dutch television
Eurosport